Sidnia kinbergi, also known by its common name Australian crop mirid is a species from the genus Sidnia.

References

Mirini